Wild Blue (Part I) is the fourth major label studio album released by American singer-songwriter Hunter Hayes, released on August 16, 2019 through Warner Music Nashville. Hayes co-produced and co-wrote every track on the album.

Background
Hayes initially planned to release the album on October 11, 2019, the eighth anniversary of his first studio album, but in August 2019, Hayes made a surprise announcement on NBC's Today show revealing that the album would be released on August 16, 2019. The album is the first part of a trilogy of albums. The album was only been released digitally and to streaming platforms. In October 2021, Hayes released Wild Blue Complete, an extended, altered version of the album with six new songs.

Commercial performance

The album debuted at number 44 on Billboards Top Country Albums. It has sold 1,400 copies in the United States as of September 2019.

Track listing
Track listing adapted from Rolling Stone.

Personnel

Adapted from AllMusic.

Charts

Album

Singles

References

2019 albums
Hunter Hayes albums
Warner Records albums